The De Tomaso Mangusta is an Italian sports car produced between 1967 and 1971.

Mangusta  may also refer to:

 Qvale Mangusta, a 1999 sports car
 Agusta A129 Mangusta, attack helicopter

See also